Return to Greendale is a live album from American-Canadian folk rock musician Neil Young and American rock band Crazy Horse recorded in 2003 while touring to promote the album Greendale.

Recording and release
Young announced the Greendale Live album on his website on January1, 2020 with the intention to release it in the year, alongside Way Down in the Rust Bucket, a 1990 recording of his tour with Crazy Horse supporting Ragged Glory. The album was initially announced for release on June19 before being delayed until its release on November6. A concert film edition was screened in SanFrancisco and via the Movietone section of Neil Young's Archives website. On September25, Young revealed that the album would be released on compact disc, vinyl LP, and the concert film edition on Blu-ray and DVD with the documentary Inside Greendale.

Track listing
"Falling from Above"– 7:41
"Double E"– 5:31
"Devil's Sidewalk"– 6:22
"Leave the Driving"– 6:33
"Carmichael"– 10:39
"Bandit"– 6:34
"Grandpa's Interview"– 13:23
"Bringin' Down Dinner"– 3:16
"Sun Green"– 12:18
"Be the Rain"– 8:19

Personnel
Neil Young and Crazy Horse
Ralph Molina– drums, vocals
Billy Talbot– bass guitar, vocals
Frank "Poncho" Sampedro– Wurlitzer electric piano
Neil Young– guitar, organ, harmonica, vocals, art direction, design

Additional personnel
Chris Bellman– mastering at Grundman Mastering
Gabe Burch– mixing assistance on "Bandit"
dhlovelife– art direction and design
John Hanlon– editing and mixing on "Bandit" at The Village and master transfer assembly
John Hausmann– mixing assistance, except on "Bandit"
James Mazzeo– illustration
The Mountainettes (Twink Brewer, Nancy Hall, Susan Hall, Pegi Young)– backing vocals
Tim Mulligan– editing and mixing at Redwood Digital, except on "Bandit"
John Nowland– mixing assistance
Harry Sitam– technical support

Charts

References

External links

2020 live albums
Neil Young live albums
Crazy Horse (band) albums
Concert films
Warner Records live albums